A field goal is a means of scoring in gridiron football.

Field goal may also refer to:

Sports
 Field goal (basketball), a scoring play in basketball normally worth two or three points
 Three-point field goal, the three-point instance of the above
 Four-point field goal, an uncommon variant of the above
 Field goal (rugby), an obsolete method of scoring in rugby football
 Drop goal, a contemporary method of scoring (also known as a field goal) in rugby football

Others
 Field Goal (video game), a 1979 arcade game
 Project Field Goal, part of Operation Millpond, a 1961 American covert operation during the Laotian Civil War

See also

 Goal (sports), various scoring methods